The 2013–14 Houston Cougars men's basketball team represented the University of Houston during the 2013–14 NCAA Division I men's basketball season. The season marked the first for the Cougars as members of the American Athletic Conference. The team, coached by James Dickey in his fourth year, played their home games at Hofheinz Pavilion. They finished the season 17–16, 8–10 in conference play to finish in sixth place. They advanced to the semifinals of the American Conference tournament where they lost to Louisville.

After the season, Dickey stepped down for personal reasons. He was 64–62 in four seasons, and was replaced by Kelvin Sampson.

Pre-season
The Cougars' off-season had been defined primarily by the number of departures from the program. On May 14, the school announced that it had granted permission to sophomore point guard J. J. Thompson to transfer to another school. No reason was given. Ten days later, the school announced that four-star 2012 class recruit Valentine Izundu was also granted release from the program. Like Thompson, no reason why given for Izundu's departure, but it was noted that he had seen very limited playing time in his previous season as a freshman. However, one month after announcing his leave, Izundu decided to return. In his statement, he apologized to Coach Dickey and teammates and mentioned that he made a mistake in leaving the team. On June 1, the program announced that Michael Young, former Cougar player and Phi Slama Jama member during the 1980–84 seasons, would not be retained as Director of Basketball Operations. Young was offered a reassignment in the program, but refused it and decided to leave the school. As a result, his son Joe Young, the Cougars' leading scorer during the 2012–13 season also decided to leave the program and transfer to Oregon.

Despite the departures, the Cougars were still able to build by signing Ohio Player of the Year and three-star recruit Jaaron Simmons. The point guard out of Archbishop Alter High School signed a national letter of intent on April 18, choosing the Cougars over Butler and Dayton, among others. Simmons mentioned that the opportunity to play with standout players Danuel House, Joe Young, and TaShawn Thomas helped in his decision to sign with Houston. In June, former Baylor guard L. J. Rose announced his transfer to Houston to be closer to his mother who had been diagnosed with lupus. Rose was ranked 63rd in the ESPN100 Class of 2012 and 9th at guard. The Cougars applied for a waiver to the NCAA to allow Rose to play for the team immediately, and the waiver was granted on August 20. The third offseason addition to the Cougars was 6'9" Egyptian-born post player Ahmed Hamdy, who had international experience at the 2010 FIBA Under-17 World Championship with the Egyptian national team.

Departures

Incoming transfers

Class of 2013 signees

Roster

Schedule and results
On May 21, the Cougars participation as one of the four hosts in the 2013 Legends Classic alongside Pittsburgh, Stanford, and Texas Tech was announced. Houston hosted a pair of regional round games between November 17–21, and then traveled to Brooklyn to participate in the championship round with the other four hosts on November 25–26 at the Barclays Center.

The Cougars' 2013-14 schedule was announced on August 21, featuring 17 home games. The schedule's highlights included round-robin play against the other nine American Athletic Conference members, the four previously-announced Legends Classic games, a road game against former Southwest Conference rival Texas A&M, and a neutral site matchup against crosstown rival Rice at the Toyota Center. All of Houston's 18 conference games and the two final games of the Legends Classic tournament were televised on the ESPN family of networks or CBS Sports Network.

|-
! colspan="12" style="background:#c00; color:white;"| Exhibition

|-
! colspan="12" style="background:#c00; color:white;"| Non-conference regular season

|-
! colspan="12" style="background:#c00; color:white;"| American Athletic Conference regular season

|-
! colspan="12" style="background:#c00; color:white;"| American Athletic Conference tournament

References

Houston
Houston Cougars men's basketball seasons
Houston
Houston